Montier-en-Der is a former commune in the Haute-Marne department in north-eastern France. On 1 January 2016, it was merged into the new commune La Porte du Der. The 10th century church of the former Montier-en-Der Abbey has been preserved.

See also
Communes of the Haute-Marne department

References 

Montierender